In October 2022, Crete, the largest island of Greece was hit by destructive floods. The floods were triggered by a large thunderstorm and heavy rains.

Response 
On 15 October, flash floods hit the north coast of Crete. Extensive damage was reported in many seaside areas. Settlements affected included Agia Pelagia, Lygaria, Chania and Lasithi.

On 16 October, a government taskforce arrived on scene.

References 

History of Crete
Floods in Greece
G
2022 floods in Europe
2022 disasters in Greece